Mayiladuthurai is a 38th district and a legislative assembly constituency in the Indian state of Tamil Nadu. Elections and Winners from this constituency are listed below.
It was separated from Nagapattinam district and announced as Mayiladuthurai district on 24 March 2020. It is 38th district of Tamil Nadu.
Most successful party: DMK & INC (5 times). It is one of the 234 State Legislative Assembly Constituencies in Tamil Nadu, in India.

History
N. Kittappa of the Dravida Munnetra Kazhagam served as member for the Mayiladuthurai legislative constituency for four consecutive terms from 1967 to 1984. The Indian National Congress has won the seat four times (1957, 1962, 1991 and 2006), the Dravida Munnetra Kazhagam, five times (1967, 1971, 1977, 1980, 1989); the Anna Dravida Munnetra Kazhagam, Tamil Maanila Congress (Moopanar) and the Bharatiya Janata Party, once each.

Madras State

Tamil Nadu

Election results

2021

2016

2011

2006

2001

1996

1991

1989

1984

1980

1977

1971

1967

1962

1957

1952

References 

 

Assembly constituencies of Tamil Nadu
Mayiladuthurai district